San Gil is a town municipality in the Department of Santander in northeastern Colombia, located roughly 300 km (192 mi) from Bogotá and 95 km from the department's capital, Bucaramanga. As of 2020, San Gil had a population of roughly 46,000 people within the total municipal area, making it the third largest urban area in the department, after Bucaramanga and Barrancabermeja. Founded in 1689, San Gil is over 300 years old. It was officially named the tourist capital of the region in 2004, thanks to its outdoor activity opportunities such as rafting, caving, kayaking and hiking.

History 
San Gil's history goes back to pre-Columbian times, when it was inhabited by native indigenous people called the Guanes. Spanish conquest during the colonial period nearly eradicated the local tribes. The town was officially founded on March 17, 1689, by Don Gil Cabrera Dávalos and Leonardo Correa de Betancourt. According to official sources, San Gil played an important role during the Colombian independence period. "Comuneros" rebels came from nearby regions, united, traveled to the capital, Bogota, and fought for the nation's independence, a process which occurred during the early 1820s.

Demographics 

San Gil's population, as of 2005, was 42,000, (including the rural area). The majority (36,748) reside in the urban area. The population as of 2020 was estimated to be 46’152, an increase of roughly 1,500 people, but showing a tendency to decrease in rural areas, decreasing from 6,240 to a projected 5,601.
Ninety-eight percent of houses have access to electricity, 90.3% to running water, and 84.1% to a sewage system.

Tourism 

In 2004, San Gil was named the tourist capital of the region.  The area offers several outdoor activity opportunities, such as rafting (grade 1–5), kayaking, hiking, and caving. Local companies offer rafting packages through various rivers depending on skill level. “Parque el Gallineral” is a popular destination with its characteristic moss-covered trees resembling beards. It has a small entrance fee. The park has a number of paths running through its 10-acre area and by the city's main river, “Rio Fonce”. The park's name comes from the 1867 characteristic  “gallinero” trees planted throughout the whole area. San Gil's main square is called "Parque la Libertad" (Liberty Park), which is the most common meeting place in the town and a hub for night life. The town's main cathedral, built in 1791 and remodeled in 1965, is located in this area. “Parque Nacional del Chicamocha” (Chicamocha National Park or PANACHI) is another Eco-tourist park located roughly 1 hour away from San Gil, placed on a scenic spot in the Chicamocha Canyon. The park has a museum, hiking trails, rafting, paragliding and other outdoor activities. It also has a 6.3 km (3.91 mi) long cable car, one of the longest in the world in its category, offering a ride across the canyon and into the plateau called "Mesa de los Santos".
Barichara, a small colonial town roughly 20 minutes away from San Gil, is another popular destination.  Situated at the rim of the Chicamocha Canyon, it offers a scenic view across the canyon and the Suarez River.  It is known as "one of the prettiest towns in the whole nation" due to its well preserved colonial architecture and stone streets.

Economy 

Besides tourism, the region's economy relies heavily on agriculture.  Products such as tobacco, sugar cane and coffee are commonly grown in farms nearby  which are mainly commercialized in the town's main market plaza.
One of the region's most historically important entrepreneurs was  José María Rueda Gómez, known as "Conde de Cuchicute", who, in spite of his eccentricity, pushed the development of coffee production, and helped establish the first bank and a hydroelectric power plant for the region.

Transport 

San Gil is very well connected to the rest of the country. By Air it is connected through  "Los Pozos" a small regional airport for chartered flights and seasonal commercial flights

By land Berlinas del Fonce, Copetran, Omega, Reina and Cootrasangil among other companies ensure connectivity with Bogota and Bucaramanga.

Notable people 
 Margalida Castro (born 1943 in San Gil) a Colombian theatre and television actress
 Jorge Luis Pinto (born 1952 in San Gil) a Colombian football coach, and former manager of the Costa Rica national football team and Honduras national football team.
 Paola Rey (born 1979, in San Gil, Santander, Colombia) is a Colombian actress and model

References

External links 

  San Gil official website

Municipalities of Santander Department
Populated places established in 1689
1689 establishments in the Spanish Empire